This article concerns the period 79 BC – 70 BC.

References